John Fyfe Thomson (1915 – 30 July 1944) was a Scottish footballer who played for Hamilton Academical, mainly as a left half. He became an increasingly important member of the Accies team during the 1930s during which they consistently finished in the top half of the Scottish Football League's top division, although an injury kept him out of the team for the club's most significant achievement of the era, the run to the 1935 Scottish Cup Final.

Thomson joined the Gordon Highlanders during World War II, playing in wartime competitions for Hamilton, Ayr United and Albion Rovers. He was killed in action in France during the Battle of Normandy while serving with the 2nd Battalion, Gordon Highlanders, part of the 15th (Scottish) Infantry Division, in 1944, aged 28. He is buried at Hottot-les-Bagues War Cemetery and commemorated in a small plaque at the New Douglas Park stadium, along with Jimmy Morgan, a teammate who also died in the conflict (coincidentally, a day later in an unrelated incident).

See also
List of footballers killed during World War II

References

1915 births
1944 deaths
Footballers from Hamilton, South Lanarkshire
Association football wing halves
Scottish footballers
Scotland youth international footballers
Blantyre Victoria F.C. players
Hamilton Academical F.C. players
Ayr United F.C. wartime guest players
Albion Rovers F.C. wartime guest players
Scottish Junior Football Association players
Scottish Football League players
Gordon Highlanders soldiers
British Army personnel killed in World War II
Burials at Hottot-les-Bagues War Cemetery
Military personnel from Lanarkshire